Kenneth Jørgensen (born 7 March 1984) is a Danish curler.

At the national level, he is a two-time Danish junior champion curler (2004, 2005).

Teams

References

External links

Living people
1984 births
Danish male curlers